Spital-in-the-Street is a small hamlet in the West Lindsey district of Lincolnshire, England. Nearby villages include Hemswell to the west, Glentham to the east, and Glentworth to the south-west.

History
The first part of its name, "Spital", comes from the ancient hospital for the poor which was situated here, having its origins in a Hermitage. Hermits, or 'Eremites' dwellers in the eremos or wilderness, commonly placed their Hermitages in remote spots, often on highways, to extend hospitality to travellers.

The chapel attached to the hermitage was dedicated to St Edmund.  Edward II granted a licence for land and rent to be appropriated by the Vicar of Tealby for the payment of the Chaplain; and by a document signed at Tealby in 1323 and witnessed by nearly all the dignitaries of Lincoln Cathedral the foundation was placed under the jurisdiction of the Dean and Chapter.  Ten years later the hermitage was called “Spital-on-the-Street” so its use had probably already been enlarged, although there is no documentary evidence of this.  All that is known is the building of a house for the Chaplain by John of Harrington in 1333.

A fair and a market were inaugurated in 1324.

In 1396 Richard II granted to Thomas de Aston, Canon of Lincoln, leave to build a house "adjoining the west side of the chapel for the residence of William Wyhom the Chaplain and of certain poor persons there resident and their successors", and before the end of the 14th century it had buildings sufficient for these poor persons.  It escaped Henry VIII’s dissolution of the monasteries only to be later seized by Elizabeth I for the Crown and sold.

The Sessions for the Kirton division of Lindsey were for many years held in the chapel, but it fell into disrepair and was pulled down by Sir William Wray in 1594 with a new Session's House built nearby.  In 1660 Robert Mapletoft of Pembroke College, Cambridge was appointed Sub-Dean of Lincoln Cathedral and also Master of the Spital Hospital; he rebuilt the chapel in 1661 and set about improving the hospital's revenues.  By the mid-19th century, the Charity Commissioners estimated the hospital's revenues to be £959 per year, although they said that most of this was being misappropriated. This money, a considerable amount, was eventually recovered and used to endow De Aston School in Market Rasen, to restore Lincoln Grammar School and pay the alms of four neighbouring parishes.

The chapel was restored in 1864 but by the end of the 19th century the hospital had been abandoned and only the chapel remained, falling ever further into dereliction until being restored once again in the 1990s.

References

External links

Hamlets in Lincolnshire
West Lindsey District